A Collection of Sacred Hymns for the Church of Jesus Christ of Latter-day Saints in Europe, informally known as the Manchester Hymnal, was first published in Manchester, England, in 1840.  Like the first Latter Day Saint hymnal, this hymnal is text-only; it went through many editions, lasting until 1912 (not all publications were in Manchester, England, though they were published in England until 1890)—future editions supposedly had extra hymns added, but the first few had 271 (though there were some errors in the numbering).

List of Songs (by first line)

Public Worship
 1. The Morning Breaks, the Shadows Flee
 2. Let Every Mortal Ear Attend
 3. Glorious Things of Thee Are Spoken
 4. The Time Is Nigh, That Happy Time
 5. Great Is the Lord! 'Tis Good to Praise
 6. Let All Creation Join
 7. O Happy Souls Who Pray
 8. Praise to God, Immortal Praise
 9. We're Not Ashamed to Own Our Lord
 10. Joy to the World! the Lord Will Come!
 11. To Him That Made the World
 12. Ere Long the Veil Will Rend in Twain
 13. Jesus the Name That Charms Our Fears
 14. Come All Ye Saints Who Dwell on Earth
 15. God Spake the Word, and Time Began
 16. Mortals Awake! With Angels Join
 17. O Jesus! the Giver
 18. Ho! Every One That Thirsts, Draw Nigh
 19. And Can I Yet Delay
 20. Come, Lord, from above, the Mountains Remove
 21. God Moves in a Mysterious Way
 22. Shepherd, of Souls, with Pitying Eye
 23. Away, My Unbelieving Fear!
 24. Peace Troubled Soul, Thou Need'st Not Fear
 25. Come Sinners to the Gospel Feast
 26. Thou Shepherd of Israel, and Mine
 27. Be It My Only Wisdom Here
 28. Come, Ye That Love the Lord
 29. Happy Soul, That, Free from Harms
 30. Happy the Man That Finds the Grace
 31. Happy the Souls That First Believed
 32. Jesus from Whom All Blessings Flow
 33. Weary Souls, That Wander Wide
 34. Ye Simple Souls, That Stray
 35. Sinners, Believe the Gospel Word
 36. Would Jesus Have the Sinner Die?
 37. Let Earth and Heaven Agree
 38. Jesus, Thou All-Redeeming Lord
 39. Come, Let Us Anew Our Journey Pursue
 40. What Are These Arrayed in White
 41. Spirit of Faith, Come Down
 42. Come, Holy Ghost, Our Hearts Inspire
 43. Inspirer of the Ancient Seers
 44. Author of Faith, Eternal Word
 45. O Disclose Thy Lovely Face
 46. And Can It Be That I Should Gain
 47. My God, I Am Thine, What a Comfort Divine
 48. Let All Men Rejoice, By Jesus Restored
 49. My God, the Spring of All My Joys
 50. Talk with Us, Lord, Thyself Reveal
 51. How Happy, Gracious Lord, Are We
 52. When Israel out of Egypt Came
 53. I'll Praise My Maker While I've Breath
 54. Praise Ye the Lord! 'Tis Good to Raise
 55. Away with Our Fears! The Glad Morning Appears
 56. Blest Be Our Everlasting Lord
 57. Jehovah, God the Father, Bless
 58. Father, How Wide Thy Glory Shines!
 59. Soldiers of Christ, Arise
 60. Peace! Doubting Heart; My God's I Am
 61. Shall I, for Fear of Feeble Man
 62. Come, Saviour Jesus, from Above
 63. Shepherd Divine, Our Wants Relieve
 64. Jesus, My Strength, My Hope
 65. Saviour, on Me the Want Bestow
 66. Hark, How the Watchmen Cry
 67. Ye, Who in His Courts Are Found
 68. Captain of Israel's Host, and Guide
 69. When Quiet in My House I Sit
 70. O Thou, to Whose All-Searching Sight
 71. From All That Dwell below the Skies
 72. Come, Let Us Join Our Cheerful Songs
 73. Praise the Lord, Who Reigns Above
 74. Awake, and Sing the Song
 75. Begin, My Tongue, the Heavenly Theme
 76. Let Heathens to Their Idols Haste
 77. This God Is the God We Adore
 78. With Israel's God Who Can Compare?
 79. O'er the Gloomy Hills of Darkness
 80. Come Hither, All Ye Weary Souls
 81. Ye Dying Sons of Men
 82. Before Jehovah's Awful Throne
 83. Come, Sound His Praise Abroad
 84. My Soul, How Lovely Is the Place
 85. Lord, We Come before Thee Now
 86. Come, Dearest Lord, Descend and Dwell
 87. Come, Thou Desire of All Thy Saints
 88. God of My Life, to Thee I Call
 89. As the Dew, from Heaven Distilling
 90. O Thou, at Whose Almighty Word
 91. Once More We Come before Our God
 92. Come, Guilty Souls, and Flee Away
 93. How Precious Is Thy Word, O Lord!
 94. Arise, O King of Kings, Arise
 95. Lord, Dismiss Us with Thy Blessing
 96. May We, Who Know the Joyful Sound
 97. O Jesus, Our Lord, Thy Name Be Adored
 98. The Rising Sun Has Chased the Night
 99. Ye Ransomed Sinners Hear
 100. Lord, I Believe Thy Every Word
 101. Let Not the Wise His Wisdom Boast
 102. Father, to Thee My Soul I Lift
 103. Messiah, Full of Grace
 104. And Are We Yet Alive
 105. All Praise to Our Redeeming Lord
 106. Jesus, Lord, We Look to Thee
 107. Praise Ye the Lord, My Heart Shall Join
 108. Kingdoms and Thrones to God Belong
 109. O Lord, Our Heavenly King
 110. Lord, Thou Hast Searched and Seen Me Through
 111. The Veil of Night Is No Disguise
 112. Sweet Is the Memory of Thy Grace
 113. With All My Powers of Heart and Tongue
 114. O God, on Thee We All Depend
 115. Ye Sons of Men, a Feeble Race
 116. Dismiss Your Anxious Care
 117. When God's Own People Stand in Need
 118. When All Thy Mercies, O My God
 119. How Pleasant, How Divinely Fair
 120. Sweet Is the Work, My God, My King
 121. Not to the Terrors of the Lord
 122. Come, Holy Spirit, Heavenly Dove
 123. How Happy Every Child of Grace
 124. When I Can Read My Title Clear
 125. Except the Lord Conduct the Plan
 126. And Let Our Bodies Part
 127. God of All Consolation, Take
 128. Sing to the Great Jehovah's Praise
 129. I Long to Behold Him Arrayed
 130. On Jordan's Stormy Banks I Stand
 131. Soon as I heard My Father Say
 132. Great God, Attend, While Zion Sings
 133. O God, Our Help in Ages Past

Dismission - Doxologies
 134. May the Grace of Christ our Saviour
 135. Praise God, from Whom All Blessings Flow
 136. Glory to God on High
 137. To Father, Son, and Holy Ghost

Sacramental Hymns
 138. Alas! and Did My Saviour Bleed!
 139. Twas on That Dark, That Solemn Night
 140. Arise, My Soul, Arise
 141. Behold the Saviour of Mankind
 142. He Died; the Great Redeemer Died
 143. O God, the Eternal Father
 144. I Know That My Redeemer Lives
 145. Gently Raise the Sacred Strain
 146. Ye Children of Our God
 147. Behold Thy Sons and Daughters, Lord

Baptismal Hymns
 148. Jesus, Mighty King in Zion
 149. In Jordan's Tide the Prophet Stands
 150. Salem's Bright King, Jesus by Name
 151. Come Ye Children of the Kingdom
 152. Do We Not Know That Solemn Word
 153. In Pleasure Sweet Here We Do Meet
 154. Thus Was the Great Redeemer Plunged
 155. Never Does Truth More Shine
 156. Come, All Ye Sons of Grace, and View
 157. All You That Love Immanuel's Name
 158. Dear Lord, and Will Thy Pardoning Love
 159. Behold the Lamb of God!
 160. 'Twas the Commission of Our Lord
 161. In Ancient Times a Man of God
 162. Father in Heaven, We Do Believe
 163. How Foolish to the Carnal Mind
 164. Lo! on the Water's Brink We Stand
 165. Come, Humble Sinner, in Whose Breast
 166. Repent Ye Gentiles All

Funeral Hymns
 167. Hark! from the Tombs a Doleful Sound
 168. Why Do We Mourn for Dying Friends
 169. Why Should We Start and Fear to Die!
 170. Creation Speaks with Awful Voice
 171. The Morning Flowers Display Their Sweets

On Priesthood
 172. In Ancient Days Men Feared the Lord
 173. Now We'll Sing with One Accord

Second Coming of Christ
 174. Awake, O Ye People! The Saviour Is Coming
 175. From the Regions of Glory an Angel Descended
 176. Let All the Saints Their Hearts Prepare
 177. Let Us Pray, Gladly Pray
 178. Let Zion in Her Beauty Rise
 179. My Soul Is Full of Peace and Love
 180. Now Let Us Rejoice in the Day of Salvation
 181. The Glorious Day Is Rolling On
 182. Behold the Great Redeemer Comes
 183. Behold the Saviour Comes
 184. Earth Is the Place Where Christ Will Reign
 185. Behold the Mount of Olives Rend!
 186. Hosanna to the Great Messiah
 187. Jesus Once of Humble Birth
 188. This Earth Shall Be a Blessed Place
 189. At First, the Babe of Bethlehem
 190. Come, O! Thou King of Kings!
 191. Let All the Saints Their Hearts Prepare

Gathering of Israel
 192. Redeemer of Israel
 193. What Wondrous Things We Now Behold
 194. Ye Ransomed of the Lord
 195. An Holy Angel from on High
 196. What Wondrous Scenes Mine Eyes Behold
 197. An Angel from on High
 198. On Mountain Tops the Mount of God

Morning Hymns
 199. Awake! for the Morning Is Come
 200. Awake My Soul, and with the Sun
 201. Lord, in the Morning Thou Shalt Hear
 202. Once More, My Soul, the Rising Day
 203. See How the Morning Sun
 204. Waked from My Bed of Slumber Sweet

Evening Hymns
 205. Come, Let Us Sing an Evening Hymn
 206. Glory to Thee, My God, This Night
 207. Great God! to Thee My Evening Song
 208. Lord, Thou Wilt Hear Me When I Pray
 209. The Day Is Past and Gone

Farewell Hymns
 210. Adieu My Dear Brethren Adieu
 211. Farewell, Our Friends and Brethren!
 212. From Greenland's Icy Mountains
 213. How Often in Sweet Meditation, My Mind
 214. The Gallant Ship Is under Way
 215. Yes, My Native Land, I Love Thee
 216. Farewell, My Kind and Faithful Friend
 217. Adieu to the city, Where Long I Have Wandered
 218. Keep These Few Lines Till Time Shall End
 219. Farewell, Ye Servants of the Lord
 220. When Shall We All Meet Again?
 221. To Leave My Dear Friends, and from Neighbors to Part
 222. When Time Shall Be No More

Miscellaneous
 223. An Angel Came down from the Mansions of Glory
 224. Before this Earth from Chaos Sprung
 225. A Poor Wayfaring Man of Grief
 226. Come, All Ye Sons of Zion
 227. Earth, with Her Ten Thousand Flowers
 228. Guide Us, O Thou Great Jehovah
 229. How Firm a Foundation, Ye Saints of the Lord
 230. How Pleasant 'Tis to See
 231. How Pleased and Blessed Was I
 232. Know Then That Every Soul Is Free
 233. The Great and Glorious Gospel Light
 234. The Happy Day Has Rolled On
 235. The Lord into His Garden Comes
 236. The Spirit of God Like a Fire Is Burning
 237. The Sun That Declines in the Far Western Sky
 238. The Cities of Zion Soon Shall Rise
 239. There's a Feast of Fat Things for the Righteous Preparing
 240. This Land Was Once a Glorious Place
 241. Though, in the Outward Church Below
 242. What Fair One Is This, from the Wilderness Traveling
 243. When Joseph His Brethren Beheld
 244. When Restless on My Bed I Lie
 245. Hark! Listen to the Trumpeters
 246. The Pure Testimony Poured Forth in the Spirit
 247. Afflicted Saint, to Christ Draw Near
 248. Daniel's Wisdom May I Know
 249. When Joseph Saw His Brethren Moved
 250. Ye Wondering Nations, Now Give Ear
 251. I Saw a Mighty Angel Fly
 252. Go, Ye Messengers of Glory
 253. All Hail the Glorious Day
 254. The Glorious Plan, Which God Has Given
 255. Truth Reflects upon Our Senses
 256. Stars of Morning, Shout for Joy
 257. Let Judah Rejoice in This Glorious News
 258. When Earth in Bondage Long Had Lain
 259. The Solid Rocks Were Rent in Twain
 260. O Who That Has Searched in the Records of Old
 261. Hark! Listen to the Gentle Breeze
 262. Another Day Has Fled and Gone
 263. How Fleet the Precious Moments Roll!
 264. Lift up Your Heads, Ye Scattered Saints
 265. Torn from Our Friends and Captive Led
 266. This Morning in Silence I Ponder and Mourn
 267. 'Mid Scenes of Confusion and Creature Complaints
 268. By the River's Verdant Side
 269. O Zion, When I Think on Thee
 270. Children of Zion, Awake from Your Sadness
 271. I Have No Home, Where Shall I Go?

References

External links
 View this hymnal from Online Collections at BYU (scanned images) (to get the entire hymnal, download the version for printing, and change the extension to pdf)
 the Fourth Edition (1844), from Online Collections at BYU
 Mislocated link to download the printing version of it. (Click on Printing Version - when they fix this, it'll be for another hymnal, as the rest of the page is for another hymnal.)
 Text of every hymn found in this hymnal, at hymnwiki.org

History of the Latter Day Saint movement
Latter Day Saint hymnals
1840 books
1840 in Christianity
1840 in music
1840 in England